Serebryanka is a rural locality (a settlement) in Gaynsky District, Perm Krai, Russia. The population was 631 in 2010. There are 17 streets.

Geography 
Serebryanka is located 63 km northwest of Gayny (the district's administrative centre) by road. Onyl is the nearest rural locality.

References 

Rural localities in Gaynsky District